Gustavo Raúl Gómez Portillo (born 6 May 1993) is a Paraguayan footballer who currently plays as a defender for and captains the Brazilian Serie A club Palmeiras and the Paraguay national team.

Club career

Lanús
Gómez is considered one of the most promising defenders of Paraguay, who began his playing career at Libertad. In the summer of 2014, Gómez left Libertad to play for Argentine Primera División side Lanús. Gustavo Gomez's Lanus conceded a mere 10 goals in 17 games en route to securing 2016 Argentine Primera Division title.

AC Milan
On 5 August 2016, Gómez completed a move to AC Milan for a fee reported to be in the region of €8.5 million, signing a 5-year contract. He is the first ever Paraguayan footballer to play for Milan. After joining the club he chose number 15, in tribute of his former Lanús teammate, Diego Barisone who died in a car accident. 

On 27 August 2016, he made his full debut for Milan in Serie A against Napoli, where Napoli beat Milan 4–2.

Palmeiras
On 2 August 2018, Gómez was announced for Palmeiras on a one year loan deal. Being considered by supporters as one of the best centerbacks of Palmeiras history, he helped the team win one Campeonato Brasileiro in 2018, two Copa Libertadores in 2020 and 2021, and the Copa do Brasil also in 2020.

International career
Gustavo's first selection to the Paraguay national team was for a friendly against Germany in August 2013.
On 7 September 2013 he debuted against Bolivia at the age of 20 years old
. In that game he scored his first international goal.
He has since been a regular fixture for Paraguay. He played for Paraguay in the Copa América Centenario in 2016, where he started all the 3 games for them.

Style of play
Gustavo is a strong defender capable of playing in any position at the back. He is a hard tackler and good in the air. He was instrumental in Lanus's style of building attacks from behind.

Career statistics

Club

International

International goals
Scores and results list Paraguay's goal tally first.

Honours

Club
Libertad
Paraguayan Primera División: 2012 Clausura, 2014 Apertura

Lanus
Argentine Primera División: 2016

Milan
Supercoppa Italiana: 2016

Palmeiras
Campeonato Brasileiro Série A: 2018, 2022
Campeonato Paulista: 2020, 2022
Copa do Brasil: 2020
Copa Libertadores: 2020, 2021
Recopa Sudamericana: 2022

Individual
U-20 South American Championship Team of the Tournament: 2013
Paraguayan Primera División Team of the Season: 2013
Copa Argentina Team of the Season: 2014–15
Argentine Primera División Team of the Season: 2016
Bola de Prata: 2019, 2020, 2022
Copa Libertadores Team of the Tournament: 2020, 2021, 2022
Campeonato Brasileiro Série A Team of the Year: 2020, 2021, 2022
Copa do Brasil Team of the Season: 2020
South American Footballer of the Year Bronze Ball: 2020, 2021
South American Team of the Year: 2020, 2021, 2022
South American Defender of the Year: 2020, 2021
Paraguayan Footballer of the Year: 2021
IFFHS CONMEBOL Team of the Year: 2021
Campeonato Paulista Team of the Year: 2022

Notes

In isolation, Gómez is pronounced .

References

External links
 
 

1993 births
Living people
People from Misiones Department
Paraguayan footballers
Association football central defenders
Club Libertad footballers
Club Atlético Lanús footballers
A.C. Milan players
Sociedade Esportiva Palmeiras players
Paraguayan Primera División players
Argentine Primera División players
Serie A players
Campeonato Brasileiro Série A players
Paraguay under-20 international footballers
Paraguay international footballers
Copa Libertadores-winning players
Copa América Centenario players
2019 Copa América players
2021 Copa América players
Paraguayan expatriate footballers
Paraguayan expatriate sportspeople in Argentina
Paraguayan expatriate sportspeople in Italy
Paraguayan expatriate sportspeople in Brazil
Expatriate footballers in Argentina
Expatriate footballers in Italy
Expatriate footballers in Brazil